The Intermountain Manufacturing Company (IMCO) was a US aircraft manufacturer of the 1960s based in Afton, Wyoming that produced agricultural aircraft.

IMCO was formed in 1962 to purchase the assets of the failed Call Aircraft Company, and the following year commenced new production of the CallAir A-9. IMCO also developed an enlarged and refined version of the aircraft, designated the B-1.

Aero Commander, a division of Rockwell International purchased IMCO in 1966 and relocated production to Albany, Georgia the following year.

References

Defunct aircraft manufacturers of the United States
Companies based in Wyoming
American companies established in 1962
Vehicle manufacturing companies established in 1962
Manufacturing companies based in Wyoming
1962 establishments in Wyoming
1960s disestablishments in Wyoming